Caleb James Lawrence (born 26 May 1941) is a Canadian retired Anglican bishop.

Lawrence was educated at Dalhousie University and ordained in 1965. He was a missionary at Great Whale River from 1965 until 1975 then Archdeacon of Arctic Quebec. In January 1980 he became the coadjutor bishop of the Diocese of Moosonee and in November of that year the diocesan bishop. He was the diocesan bishop for 30 years and from 2004 to 2009 he was also the Metropolitan of Ontario.

References

1941 births
Dalhousie University alumni
Anglican bishops of Moosonee
20th-century Anglican Church of Canada bishops
21st-century Anglican Church of Canada bishops
Metropolitans of Ontario
21st-century Anglican archbishops
Living people